Saket Bhatia (born 6 October 1978) is an Indian former cricketer. He played first-class cricket for Railways and Rajasthan and List A cricket for Delhi.

See also
 List of Delhi cricketers

References

External links
 

1978 births
Living people
Indian cricketers
Delhi cricketers
Railways cricketers
Rajasthan cricketers
Cricketers from Delhi